Noppol Pitafai (born January 2, 1985) is a Thai professional footballer who plays as a left back.

International career
Pitafai played for the Thailand national football team in 2006 under Thai coach Charnwit Polcheewin. In 2013, he was called up to the national team by Surachai Jaturapattarapong to the 2015 AFC Asian Cup qualification. In October 2013 he came in as a substitute against Bahrain in a friendly match.

International

Honours

Thailand U23
 Sea Games
  Gold medal (2) : 2005, 2007

References

External links
 
 Profile at Goal
 http://int.soccerway.com/players/noppol-pitafai/288047/

1985 births
Living people
Noppol Pitafai
Noppol Pitafai
Association football fullbacks
Noppol Pitafai
Noppol Pitafai
Noppol Pitafai
Noppol Pitafai
Noppol Pitafai
Noppol Pitafai
Noppol Pitafai
Noppol Pitafai
Noppol Pitafai
Noppol Pitafai
Footballers at the 2006 Asian Games
Noppol Pitafai
Southeast Asian Games medalists in football
Competitors at the 2005 Southeast Asian Games
Competitors at the 2007 Southeast Asian Games
Noppol Pitafai